Kellogg is an unincorporated community in Macon County, in the U.S. state of Missouri.

History
A post office called Kellogg was established in 1894, and remained in operation until 1903. R. Kellogg, an early postmaster, gave the community his last name.

References

Unincorporated communities in Macon County, Missouri
Unincorporated communities in Missouri